Dayuse.com is a booking platform for microstays based in Paris, with offices in Hong Kong and New York. Created in 2010, Dayuse.com is a website that offers the booking of daytime hotel rooms online and by telephone. The company lists over 7,000 hotels in 25 countries.
The company is not a direct provider of these services, but an intermediary that connects customers with the hotels of their choice.

In 2015, the daytime hotel booking platform Dayuse.com raised 15 million euros in a series A investment round . The investment round was led by venture capital firms Idinvest Partners and Partech Ventures, with the participation of business angels: Paul Dubrule (Co-founder of the Accor group), Charles Petruccelli (Former American Express Travel CEO), and Cédric Barbier (Creator of lesjeudis.com)

History
Dayuse.com was founded in 2010 by David Lebée and Thibaud D’Agrèves, both of whom worked at Hotel Amour in Paris. The hotel is popular with touring artists and musicians, who would ask about renting a room for a few hours during daytime as a place to relax before a performance. Lebée and D’Agrèves recognised that there was a gap in the market.

International development
 2010: Launch of the site with a dozen hotels in Paris
 2011: Launch of Dayuse.com in Belgium, Switzerland and Luxembourg
 2011: Launch of a discount version: Dayuse-pascher.com
 2012: Launch in the UK
 2012: Launch of a mobile application
 2013: Launch in the US
 2014: Dayuse.com raises 1 million euros, obtained from Partech Ventures, Cédric Barbier and Christophe Chausson
 2015: Opening of new offices in New York
 2015: Dayuse.com raises 15 million euros obtained from Idinvest Partners and Partech Ventures
 2016: Winner of the People's Choice Award for Best Innovation at Phocuswright, Los Angeles 
 2017: Opening of new offices in Hong Kong
 2018: Launch of a new mobile application 
 2018: Launch of Dayuse Business, for business travelers

References

Dutch travel websites
French travel websites